The following is a partial list of the "C" codes for Medical Subject Headings (MeSH), as defined by the United States National Library of Medicine (NLM).

This list continues the information at List of MeSH codes (C12). Codes following these are found at List of MeSH codes (C14). For other MeSH codes, see List of MeSH codes.

The source for this content is the set of 2006 MeSH Trees from the NLM.

– female genital diseases and pregnancy complications

– genital diseases, female

– adnexal diseases
  – fallopian tube diseases
  – fallopian tube neoplasms
  – salpingitis
  – ovarian diseases
  – anovulation
  – menopause, premature
  – oophoritis
  – ovarian cysts
  – polycystic ovary syndrome
  – ovarian failure, premature
  – ovarian hyperstimulation syndrome
  – ovarian neoplasms
  – brenner tumor
  – carcinoma, endometrioid
  – granulosa cell tumor
  – luteoma
  – meigs syndrome
  – sertoli-leydig cell tumor
  – thecoma
  – pelvic inflammatory disease
  – endometritis
  – oophoritis
  – parametritis
  – salpingitis

– endometriosis

– gynatresia

– herpes genitalis

– infertility
  – infertility, female

– sexual dysfunction, physiological
  – dyspareunia
  – vaginismus

– urogenital diseases
  – kidney diseases, cystic
  – medullary sponge kidney
  – multicystic dysplastic kidney
  – polycystic kidney diseases
  – polycystic kidney, autosomal dominant
  – polycystic kidney, autosomal recessive
  – tuberculosis, urogenital
  – tuberculosis, female genital
  – tuberculosis, renal
  – urogenital abnormalities
  – bladder exstrophy
  – epispadias
  – frasier syndrome
  – hypospadias
  – multicystic dysplastic kidney
  – nephritis, hereditary
  – sex differentiation disorders
  – freemartinism
  – gonadal dysgenesis
  – gonadal dysgenesis, 46,xx
  – gonadal dysgenesis, 46,xy
  – gonadal dysgenesis, mixed
  – turner syndrome
  – hermaphroditism
  – hermaphroditism, true
  – pseudohermaphroditism
  – androgen-insensitivity syndrome
  – denys-drash syndrome
  – kallmann syndrome
  – wagr syndrome
  – urogenital neoplasms
  – genital neoplasms, female
  – fallopian tube neoplasms
  – ovarian neoplasms
  – brenner tumor
  – carcinoma, endometrioid
  – granulosa cell tumor
  – luteoma
  – meigs syndrome
  – sertoli-leydig cell tumor
  – thecoma
  – uterine neoplasms
  – endometrial neoplasms
  – carcinoma, endometrioid
  – endometrial stromal tumors
  – sarcoma, endometrial stromal
  – uterine cervical neoplasms
  – vaginal neoplasms
  – vulvar neoplasms
  – urologic neoplasms
  – bladder neoplasms
  – kidney neoplasms
  – carcinoma, renal cell
  – wilms tumor
  – denys-drash syndrome
  – wagr syndrome
  – nephroma, mesoblastic
  – ureteral neoplasms
  – urethral neoplasms

– uterine diseases
  – uterine cervical diseases
  – uterine cervical dysplasia
  – uterine cervical erosion
  – uterine cervical incompetence
  – uterine cervical neoplasms
  – uterine cervicitis
  – endometrial hyperplasia
  – endometritis
  – hematometra
  – uterine hemorrhage
  – menorrhagia
  – metrorrhagia
  – uterine inversion
  – uterine neoplasms
  – endometrial neoplasms
  – endometrial stromal tumors
  – sarcoma, endometrial stromal
  – uterine cervical neoplasms
  – uterine prolapse
  – uterine rupture
  – uterine perforation

– vaginal diseases
  – dyspareunia
  – hematocolpos
  – hydrocolpos
  – vaginal discharge
  – leukorrhea
  – vaginal fistula
  – vaginal neoplasms
  – vaginismus
  – vaginitis
  – trichomonas vaginitis
  – vaginosis, bacterial
  – vulvovaginitis
  – candidiasis, vulvovaginal

– vulvar diseases
  – pruritus vulvae
  – vulvar lichen sclerosus
  – vulvar neoplasms
  – vulvitis
  – vulvovaginitis
  – candidiasis, vulvovaginal

– pregnancy complications

– abortion, spontaneous
  – abortion, habitual
  – uterine cervical incompetence
  – abortion, incomplete
  – abortion, missed
  – abortion, septic
  – abortion, threatened
  – abortion, veterinary
  – embryo loss

– chorea gravidarum

– diabetes, gestational
  – fetal macrosomia

– fetal death
  – fetal resorption

– fetal diseases
  – chorioamnionitis
  – erythroblastosis, fetal
  – hydrops fetalis
  – fetal alcohol syndrome
  – fetal growth retardation
  – fetal hypoxia
  – fetal macrosomia
  – fetal nutrition disorders
  – meconium aspiration syndrome

– hypertension, pregnancy-induced
  – eclampsia
  – hellp syndrome
  – pre-eclampsia

– obstetric labor complications
  – abruptio placentae
  – breech presentation
  – cephalopelvic disproportion
  – dystocia
  – uterine inertia
  – fetal membranes, premature rupture
  – chorioamnionitis
  – obstetric labor, premature
  – premature birth
  – placenta accreta
  – placenta previa
  – postpartum hemorrhage
  – uterine inversion
  – uterine rupture

– morning sickness
  – hyperemesis gravidarum

– oligohydramnios

– pemphigoid gestationis

– phenylketonuria, maternal

– placenta diseases
  – abruptio placentae
  – chorioamnionitis
  – placenta accreta
  – placenta previa
  – placenta, retained
  – placental insufficiency

– polyhydramnios

– pregnancy complications, cardiovascular
  – embolism, amniotic fluid

– pregnancy complications, hematologic

– pregnancy complications, infectious
  – abortion, septic
  – pregnancy complications, parasitic
  – puerperal infection

– pregnancy complications, neoplastic
  – trophoblastic neoplasms
  – gestational trophoblastic neoplasms
  – choriocarcinoma
  – trophoblastic tumor, placental site
  – hydatidiform mole
  – hydatidiform mole, invasive

– pregnancy in diabetics
  – fetal macrosomia

– pregnancy, ectopic
  – pregnancy, abdominal
  – pregnancy, tubal

– pregnancy, prolonged

– prenatal injuries
  – prenatal exposure delayed effects

– puerperal disorders
  – depression, postpartum
  – lactation disorders
  – galactorrhea
  – chiari-frommel syndrome
  – mastitis
  – postpartum hemorrhage
  – postpartum thyroiditis
  – pubic symphysis diastasis
  – puerperal infection

The list continues at List of MeSH codes (C14).

C13